The 41st General Assembly of Nova Scotia represented Nova Scotia between March 1, 1938, and September 19, 1941.

Division of seats

There were 30 members of the General Assembly, elected in the 1937 Nova Scotia general election.

List of members

Former members of the 41st General Assembly

References 

 Canadian Parliamentary Guide, 1941, AL Normandin

Terms of the General Assembly of Nova Scotia
1937 establishments in Nova Scotia
1941 disestablishments in Nova Scotia
20th century in Nova Scotia